5 Star Specials is a weekly drama anthology aired every Wednesday evenings on TV5 from March 22, 2010 to September 1, 2010. The drama anthology features prime talents in their various portrayals. Initially aired on Mondays from March 22 to May 3, 2010, and moved to Wednesdays from May 19 until it ended on September 1, 2010.

References

See also
List of programs aired by The 5 Network

2010 Philippine television series debuts
2010 Philippine television series endings
TV5 (Philippine TV network) original programming
Philippine anthology television series
Filipino-language television shows